Éric Tié Bi (born 20 July 1990) is an Ivorian professional footballer who plays for French club Thonon Évian, as a defensive midfielder.

Career
Tié Bi is a former graduate of the Olympique Lyonnais Reserves and Academy and began his career at the club. He amassed over 50 appearances with the club's Championnat de France amateur team, winning two reserve titles, before departing the club for Évian on a free transfer in May 2010.

Tié Bi made his professional debut on 30 July 2010 in a Coupe de la Ligue match against Strasbourg. He appeared as a substitute in the match, as Évian won the match 5–4 on penalties. He made his league debut a week later in a 2–0 victory over Metz.

References

External links
 
 
 

1990 births
Living people
People from Sassandra-Marahoué District
Association football midfielders
Ivorian footballers
French footballers
French sportspeople of Ivorian descent
Thonon Evian Grand Genève F.C. players
Stade Brestois 29 players
LB Châteauroux players
US Quevilly-Rouen Métropole players
Super League Greece players
Asteras Tripolis F.C. players
Ligue 1 players
Ligue 2 players
Championnat National players